Comminges and Adelaide in the Trappist Monastery or Comminges digging his own tomb watched by Adelaide disguised as a monk is the final painting by Fleury François Richard, produced between 1822 and 1844 and now in the Museum of Fine Arts of Lyon. Its subject is drawn from Les Amans malheureux, ou le Comte de Comminge (1764), a play adapted by François de Baculard d'Arnaud from the tragic lovestory of Mémoires du comte de Comminge (1735) by Claudine Guérin de Tencin.

Sources
Marie-Claude Chaudonneret, Fleury Richard et Pierre Révoil : la peinture troubadour, Paris, Arthena, 1980, 217 p.

1840s paintings
Paintings in the collection of the Museum of Fine Arts of Lyon
Paintings by Fleury François Richard